Salem Township is the name of some places in the U.S. state of Michigan:

 Salem Township, Allegan County, Michigan
 Salem Township, Washtenaw County, Michigan

See also

 Salem Township (disambiguation)

Michigan township disambiguation pages